On 3 September 1939—two days after the German invasion of Poland—France declared war on Nazi Germany according to its defensive treaty with Poland, when France's ultimatum to Germany, issued the previous day, expired at 17:00. This occurred hours after the United Kingdom declaration of war on Germany.

Text of the declaration

See also 
 United Kingdom declaration of war on Germany (1939)
 Declarations of war during World War II
 Diplomatic history of World War II

References

September 1939 events
1939 in France
1939 documents
Declarations of war during World War II
France in World War II
Military history of France during World War II
France–Germany military relations
Germany in World War II
Military history of Germany during World War II
France–United Kingdom military relations